Grant Hansen is a New Zealand rugby union coach.

Hansen was appointed as Assistant Coach to Brian Evans in 2009. When Evans took a break from coaching in 2011, Hansen, who was Assistant Coach then, was appointed as the Black Ferns Head Coach by New Zealand Rugby. His Assistant Coach was John Kyle.

Hansen coached the Black Ferns in three tests against England.

References 

Living people
New Zealand rugby union coaches
Place of birth missing (living people)
Year of birth missing (living people)
New Zealand women's national rugby union team coaches
St Peter's College, Auckland faculty